This is a list of presidents of the Swiss Council of States, the upper house of the Federal Assembly.

List

See also
Members of the Swiss Council of States
Presidents of the Swiss National Council

External links 

 List of the presidents of the Swiss Council of States (parliament.ch)

Council of States (Switzerland)
Switzerland, Council of States
Presidents